Emory Thomas (born November 3, 1939 in Richmond, Virginia) is a History Professor Emeritus at the University of Georgia and noted scholar of the American Civil War.  He earned a Ph.D. from Rice University in 1966.

Selected works

The Confederacy as a Revolutionary Experience (1970)
Confederate State of Richmond: A Biography of the Capital (1971)
The American War and Peace, 1860-1877 (1973)  
The Confederate Nation, 1861-1865 (1979)
Bold Dragoon: The Life of J.E.B. Stuart (1986)
Travels to Hallowed Ground: A Historian's Journey to the American Civil War (1987) 
Robert E. Lee: A Biography (1995)
Robert E. Lee: An Album (2000)

References

External links

University of Georgia faculty
Rice University alumni
Living people
1939 births
Writers from Athens, Georgia
Historians of the American Civil War
21st-century American historians
21st-century American male writers
20th-century American historians
American male non-fiction writers
Historians from Georgia (U.S. state)
20th-century American male writers